Hyperreflexia is overactive or overresponsive bodily reflexes. Examples of this include twitching and spastic tendencies, which indicate disease of the upper motor neurons and the lessening or loss of control ordinarily exerted by higher brain centers of lower neural pathways (disinhibition).

The most common cause of hyperreflexia is spinal-cord injury (see "Autonomic dysreflexia"). Standard stimuli, such as the filling of the bladder, can cause excessive responses from the nervous system; the causes are not known.

Hyperreflexia also has many other causes, including the side effects of drugs and stimulants; hyperthyroidism; electrolyte imbalance; serotonin syndrome; severe brain trauma; multiple sclerosis; Reye syndrome; and preeclampsia.

Treatment depends on the cause of the hyperreflexia. If drugs cause it, treatment may require that they not be used.

Recovery from hyperreflexia can occur several hours to several months after a spinal-cord injury; the phase of recovery is likely to occur in stages rather than on a continuum. The late stage is between two weeks and several months. Patients with a severe spinal-cord injury (SCI) mainly present with a later stage of recovery because during the early stages they present with spinal shock. Reflex and motor recovery can sometimes occur simultaneously.

See also
 Hyporeflexia

References

External links

 NIH/Medline
 
 Archives of Physical Medicine and Rehabilitation

Symptoms and signs: Nervous system